Cedric Demiko Goodman (born March 17, 1986) is an American sprinter who specializes in the 200 meters and 400 metres. He participated in the 2003 World Youth Championships in Athletics, winning a silver in the 400 metres.

A native of Newnan, Georgia, Goodman attended Newnan High School. Goodman later attended the University of Georgia, where he also played football besides competing in track. He was part of the 2008 Bulldogs team that started the season as preseason No. 1.

Goodman was available in the 2009 NFL Draft, but went undrafted. He was later signed by the Pittsburgh Steelers, but was released before the 2009 season began.

He now attends Austin Graduate School of Theology and has signed a sponsorship deal with Adidas, pursuing a spot on the 2012 U.S. Olympic squad.

His younger sister, Chalonda Goodman, is also a successful track athlete.

References

External links

DyeStat profile for Demiko Goodman
Georgia Bulldogs bio

1986 births
Living people
People from Newnan, Georgia
Sportspeople from the Atlanta metropolitan area
American male sprinters
American football wide receivers
African-American male track and field athletes
Georgia Bulldogs football players
Georgia Bulldogs track and field athletes
21st-century African-American sportspeople
20th-century African-American people